Sinking Spring is the name of several towns in the United States:

Sinking Spring, Ohio
Sinking Spring, Pennsylvania